Joseph Andras (born 1984) is a French writer who lives in Le Havre.

Biography 

In 2016, Joseph Andras published his first novel, De nos frères blessés, dedicated to Fernand Iveton, a "pied-noir" worker and independentist. The book was acclaimed by critics and won the Goncourt Prize for first novel, which the author refused because he didn't approve the institutionalization of writing and the idea of "competition". In May 2017, he released the record-book S'il n'restait qu'un chien, a long poem in free verse about the port of Le Havre.

At the beginning of 2018, he spent nearly two months in Chiapas, staying in one of the five centers of the Zapatista Army of National Liberation and in an indigenous community as part of a Civil Observation Brigade. In September 2018, he published Kanaky. In the Footsteps of Alphonse Dianou, a biographical investigation carried out between 2015 and 2018 in New Caledonia and metropolitan France. The investigation focuses on a socialist, pro-independence activist involved in the FLNKS and killed in 1988 after the assault on the Ouvéa cave. As part of this research, he stayed with the tribe of Gossanah.

On November 20, 2019, he published in L'Humanité an open letter to Manuel T., a "yellow vest" from the North who had been dazed by a grenade attack four days earlier. The same year, he participated in the launch of the international Free Nûdem Durak campaign.

The Prix Goncourt, first novel, 2016 

Initially not included in the list of the prix Goncourt du premier roman 2016, Joseph Andras is finally the winner, on May 9, 2016, by five votes to four to Catherine Poulain for Le Grand Marin and one vote to Loulou Robert for Bianca, that is - and exceptional fact - two days before its release in bookstores. It is the second Goncourt du premier roman consecutive novel for the editions Actes Sud, what is more about the theme of the Algerian war, after The Meursault Investigation by Kamel Daoud rewarded the previous year.

The week before the official announcement of the results, Andras let it known, by his publisher and at the private request of the Académie Goncourt, that he refused to go to Paris, to signify his refusal to participate in the selection. Despite this, the Academy awarded him the prize. – Joseph Andras sent a letter to the Académie Goncourt to decline the prize and his endowment, justifying his decision by declaring that "competition, and rivalry were in his eyes notions foreign to writing and creation." This relatively unusual move, led some media to think that he could be an already famous novelist, on the Gary/Ajar model. 
As a result of these interrogations, Joseph Andras gave interviews to L'Humanité and to the literary supplement of the Beirut daily L'Orient-Le Jour in which he explained his motivations and his work as a novelist to salute the memory of Fernand Iveton and, again, the reasons for his refusal of the prize: "I could not accept it for the sake of consistency, to help "Institutionalize" this narrative and the ideals worn by the characters. [...] I live in Normandy, quietly, I do not know the literary and Parisian environment, do not want to know more and want more than anything to concentrate on my next texts."

Only one photo of him is known. He indicates that he voluntarily keeps away from the mainstream media, preferring to devote himself to literature.

Work 
 , Actes Sud, 2016  The book retraces the life of the Communist militant Fernand Iveton, who was the only European executed during the Algerian War because of his commitment and his actions to the National Liberation Front (Algeria).

References

Notes

External links 
 De nos frères blessés  on the site of Actes Sud 

21st-century French non-fiction writers
Prix Goncourt du Premier Roman recipients
1984 births
Living people